In chemistry, pyrophosphates are  phosphorus oxyanions that contain two phosphorus atoms in a P–O–P linkage. A number of pyrophosphate salts exist, such as disodium pyrophosphate (Na2H2P2O7) and tetrasodium pyrophosphate (Na4P2O7), among others. Often pyrophosphates are called diphosphates.  The parent pyrophosphates are derived from partial or complete neutralization of pyrophosphoric acid. The pyrophosphate bond is also sometimes referred to as a phosphoanhydride bond, a naming convention which emphasizes the loss of water that occurs when two phosphates form a new P–O–P bond, and which mirrors the nomenclature for anhydrides of carboxylic acids. Pyrophosphates are found in ATP and other nucleotide triphosphates, which are important in biochemistry. The term pyrophosphate is also the name of esters formed by the condensation of a phosphorylated biological compound with inorganic phosphate, as for dimethylallyl pyrophosphate. This bond is also referred to as a high-energy phosphate bond.

Acidity
Pyrophosphoric acid is a tetraprotic acid, with four distinct pKa's:
, pKa = 0.85
, pKa = 1.96 
, pKa = 6.60
, pKa = 9.41 
The pKa's occur in two distinct ranges because deprotonations occur on separate phosphate groups.  For comparison with the pKa's for phosphoric acid are 2.14, 7.20, and 12.37.

At physiological pH's, pyrophosphate exists as a mixture of doubly and singly protonated forms.

Preparation
Disodium pyrophosphate is prepared by thermal condensation of sodium dihydrogenphosphate or by partial deprotonation of pyrophosphoric acid.

Pyrophosphates are generally white or colorless.  The alkali metal salts are water-soluble. They are good complexing agents for metal ions (such as calcium and many transition metals) and have many uses in industrial chemistry.  Pyrophosphate is the first member of an entire series of polyphosphates.

In biochemistry 
The anion  is abbreviated PPi, standing for inorganic pyrophosphate. It is formed by the hydrolysis of ATP into AMP in cells.
ATP → AMP + PPi

For example, when a nucleotide is incorporated into a growing DNA or RNA strand by a polymerase, pyrophosphate (PPi) is released. Pyrophosphorolysis is the reverse of the polymerization reaction in which pyrophosphate reacts with the 3′-nucleosidemonophosphate (NMP or dNMP), which is removed from the oligonucleotide to release the corresponding triphosphate (dNTP from DNA, or NTP from RNA).

The pyrophosphate anion has the structure , and is an acid anhydride of phosphate. It is unstable in aqueous solution and hydrolyzes into inorganic phosphate:
 + H2O → 2 
or in biologists' shorthand notation:
PPi + H2O → 2 Pi + 2 H+

In the absence of enzymic catalysis, hydrolysis reactions of simple polyphosphates such as pyrophosphate, linear triphosphate, ADP, and ATP normally proceed extremely slowly in all but highly acidic media.

(The reverse of this reaction is a method of preparing pyrophosphates by heating phosphates.)

This hydrolysis to inorganic phosphate effectively renders the cleavage of ATP to AMP and PPi irreversible, and biochemical reactions coupled to this hydrolysis are irreversible as well.

PPi occurs in synovial fluid, blood plasma, and urine at levels sufficient to block calcification and may be a natural inhibitor of hydroxyapatite formation in extracellular fluid (ECF). Cells may channel intracellular PPi into ECF. ANK is a nonenzymatic plasma-membrane PPi channel that supports extracellular PPi levels. Defective function of the membrane PPi channel ANK is associated with low extracellular PPi and elevated intracellular PPi. Ectonucleotide pyrophosphatase/phosphodiesterase (ENPP) may function to raise extracellular PPi.

From the standpoint of high energy phosphate accounting, the hydrolysis of ATP to AMP and PPi requires two high-energy phosphates, as to reconstitute AMP into ATP requires two phosphorylation reactions.
AMP + ATP → 2 ADP
2 ADP + 2 Pi → 2 ATP

The plasma concentration of inorganic pyrophosphate has a reference range of 0.58–3.78 µM (95% prediction interval).

Terpenes
Isopentenyl pyrophosphate converts to geranyl pyrophosphate the precursor to tens of thousand of terpenes and terpenoids.

As a food additive

Various diphosphates are used as emulsifiers, stabilisers, acidity regulators, raising agents, sequestrants, and water retention agents in food processing. They are classified in the E number scheme under E450:
E450(a): disodium dihydrogen diphosphate; trisodium diphosphate; tetrasodium diphosphate (TSPP); tetrapotassium diphosphate
E450(b): pentasodium and pentapotassium triphosphate
E450(c): sodium and potassium polyphosphates

In particular, various formulations of diphosphates are used to stabilize whipped cream.

See also 

 Adenosine monophosphate
 Adenosine diphosphate
 Adenosine triphosphate
 ATPase
 ATP hydrolysis
 ATP synthase
 Biochemistry
 Bone
 Calcium pyrophosphate
 Calcium pyrophosphate dihydrate deposition disease
 Catalysis
 DNA
 High energy phosphate
 Inorganic pyrophosphatase
 Nucleoside triphosphate
 Nucleotide
 Organophosphate
 Oxidative phosphorylation
 Phosphate
 Phosphoric acid
 Phosphoric acids and phosphates
 RNA
 Sodium pyrophosphate
 Superphosphate
 Thiamine pyrophosphate
 Tooth
 Zinc pyrophosphate

References

Further reading

External links

 
Anions
Dietary minerals
Molecular biology
Nucleotides
E-number additives